GSM (Global System for Mobile communications) is a standard for networking mobile devices such as mobile telephones.

GSM may also refer to:

Education
 GSM London, a higher education provider
 Guildhall School of Music and Drama, formerly Guildhall School of Music
 Graduate Studies in Mathematics, textbooks by the American Mathematical Society

Military
 Garrison Sergeant Major, in the British Army
 General Service Medal (disambiguation), various campaign medals
 Gas turbine system technician (mechanical), a U.S. Navy rating

Places
 Church of St Mary the Great, Cambridge, known as GSM
 Qeshm International Airport, Qeshm Island, Iran, IATA code GSM 
 Għajnsielem, Gozo, Malta, postcode GSM

Other uses
 non-standard for g/m2 (grams per square metre), a measure of paper density or grammage
 GSM for g/m2 (grams per square metre), a measure of thermal insulation (sleeping bags)
 see Tog (unit) of thermal insulation, (duvets)
 GSM (Grenache, Syrah, Mourvèdre) blends in Rhone Valley wine and Australian wine
 Glass Sport Motors, a former South African car company
 Flyglobespan, ICAO airline code GSM
 Gender and sexual/sexuality minorities, an alternative term to LGBT
 Ginebra San Miguel, a subsidiary of San Miguel Corporation
 Guatemalan Sign Language, ISO 639 language code: gsm

See also